Transmission Festival (also known as Transmission) is a large indoor trance music event originally based in Prague, Czech Republic at the O2 Arena. In March 2014, the festival was held for the first time in  Bratislava, Slovakia. Leaving Europe's shores for the first time, in July 2016 the festival was held in Melbourne, Australia. In March 2017 the festival extended further by visiting Bangkok, Thailand and returned to Melbourne, Australia in September. In 2018, the festival returned to Bangkok, Thailand, hosted two days at Germany's AirBeat One Festival near Neustadt-Glewe, and debuted in Shanghai for its first edition in China. In March 2019, the festival returned to Australia to Sydney Showground.

It is famous for its spectacular laser show. Markus Schulz frequently headlines the festival around the world.

Gallery

Editions

See also

List of electronic music festivals
Live electronic music

References

External links
Official Website
Facebook page
YouTube channel
Instagram
Twitter
Vimeo

Music festivals established in 2006
Electronic music festivals in Slovakia
Electronic music festivals in the Czech Republic
Electronic music festivals in Australia